Attilio Lombard (born 7 June 1944) is an Italian cross-country skier. He competed in the men's 30 kilometre event at the 1972 Winter Olympics.

References

External links
 

1944 births
Living people
Italian male cross-country skiers
Olympic cross-country skiers of Italy
Cross-country skiers at the 1972 Winter Olympics
Sportspeople from Aosta Valley